The 50 Greatest Cartoons: As Selected by 1,000 Animation Professionals is a 1994 book by animation historian Jerry Beck.

Criteria
It consists of articles about 50 highly regarded animated short films made in North America and other notable cartoons, which are ranked according to a poll of 1,000 people working in the animation industry.

Each cartoon is under 30 minutes long and cel animated (with the exception of Gertie the Dinosaur). Seventeen of the selected films were produced for Warner Bros.'s Looney Tunes and Merrie Melodies series, ten of which were directed by Chuck Jones (including the #1 cartoon on the list, What's Opera, Doc?). Forty-five of the selected cartoons were created and released before 1960; the exceptions are The Big Snit (1985), The Cat Came Back (1988), Bambi Meets Godzilla (1969), The Man Who Planted Trees (1987) and Quasi at the Quackadero (1975).

The book's front and rear cover art shows a variety of famous cartoon stars seated in a nightclub. In the appendix, a list of other cartoons with substantial votes are featured.

Legacy
A mixture of the book's selections and its runner-ups were featured on Cartoon Network on March 14, 1998, as part of "The 50 Greatest Cartoons of All Time" marathon. The reason for this is because the network only aired the cartoons owned by Warner Bros. The marathon also included interviews with animators such as Chuck Jones and Joe Barbera, as well as historian Leonard Maltin and voice actors Charlie Adler and June Foray. A similar marathon aired the following year.

See also
 Academy Award for Animated Short Film
 Submissions for Best Animated Short Academy Award

References

External links

10 of the Greatest Cartoons of All Time on Flavorwire
 List of the 50 at imdb.com

1994 books
Animation books
Top film lists
Lists of animated films
Animation fandom